HS-121 or Hs-121 can refer to:
 Hawker Siddeley HS-121 Trident, a British airliner
 Henschel Hs 121, a German trainer aircraft